Capital Magazine, also known as Capital, is a news television program. The program features the biggest topics in the news.

References

French television news shows
Mass media in French Polynesia